James William Ross IV (born 1988) is an American drag queen and reality television personality who performed under the stage name Tyra Sanchez. A frequent drag impersonator of pop star Beyoncé, Ross is best known as the winner of the second season of RuPaul's Drag Race, where he won $25,000. As of March 2020, Ross retired from his drag character Tyra Sanchez after making a public post on Instagram. 
Two years later, on September 14, 2022, Ross announced his return to drag, once again under the name "King Tyra", exclusively on his OnlyFans.

Career
A native of Gainesville, Florida, Ross moved to Orlando, where he has resided for most of his life. His drag mother was Angelica Sanchez Jones, a popular performer in the Orlando area. During his time on RuPaul's Drag Race, Ross spoke candidly about his periods of homelessness and personal challenges prior to auditioning for and being selected to appear on the show. Ross' old-school drag style and glamour made him a favorite of the judges. Currently residing in Orlando, Ross performed throughout the United States and Canada.

At the time he won the title, Ross was one of the youngest contestants to appear on RuPaul's Drag Race. Throughout his time on the show, he was referred to by RuPaul as "the other Tyra" purportedly in order to not cause confusion with America's Next Top Model host Tyra Banks. He was also the first ever winner in the show's history to never be in the bottom two, a feat that has been repeated by winners Bianca Del Rio, Violet Chachki, Sasha Velour, and Aquaria.

After winning Drag Race, Ross served as a drag professor and mentor of beauty- and fashion-challenged women on the second season of RuPaul's Drag U. In April 2011, Ross released his first dance single, "Look at Me". He released a second single, "Vogue" on October 13, 2016. He then released a spoken word EP, Dear Drag Race Fans Book I, on July 11, 2017, following the controversy surrounding him and Morgan McMichaels.

In March 2020, Ross publicly stated he was retiring from drag.

Controversies
On August 10, 2016, after a fan of the show called him annoying in a tweet followed by gun emojis, Ross replied with the message "Girl kill yourself". This was met with backlash and outrage across Twitter and Facebook. He later stated that he would not apologize for his opinion, and went on to call victims of suicide "selfish cowards." A petition was made calling for RuPaul to revoke Ross' crown and title, or at least speak out against it. RuPaul broke silence in his podcast, defending Ross' attitude, and stated: "Twitter is not the place for that. People don't get nuance on Twitter, you can't do irony on Twitter, people won't get it." During the podcast she added: "On Twitter, you don't hear inflection, you don't hear snark, you don't hear sarcasm."

In 2017, Ross posted a mock obituary for Morgan McMichaels and used the post to direct people to Ross' personal SoundCloud page. McMichaels quickly denounced the post. McMichaels later said the post was meant as retribution for her blocking Ross' booking at Mickey's nightclub in West Hollywood. After Ross made comments about drag queen Raven, McMichaels said she would not perform with Ross, and Ross lost the booking. Ross later apologized for the post about McMichaels. McMichaels later lampooned the scenario upon her re-appearance on Rupaul's Drag Race All-Stars 3; as she made her entrance to the workroom she joked "I look pretty good for a dead bitch".

Ross was announced as being banned from attending the 2018 RuPaul's DragCon L.A. event after being accused of making terrorist threats against DragCon. His official website had a timer that was set for the date and time of DragCon 2018 with the acronym "B.O.O.M." at the top of the page.; however, no act of violence was made when the timer ended.

Retirement from drag

On October 8, 2019, after a period of inactivity, Ross released an apology statement on his social media accounts, taking responsibility for his past actions. "I humbly apologize for the online behavior I have displayed in recent years," he stated. "Though it represents emotions I may have felt, it does not represent my true character. I have failed you and I know that I am much better than that…. it's not who I am and it is not who I choose to be." In explaining the reason behind his behavior, he said that "The judgement, criticism, and opinions I received daily really affected my vibes and it began to control my environment... I was on an extreme roller coaster of emotions. So many ups and too many downs. Exhausted, I was just ready to get off the ride."

Just over five months later, Ross publicly announced his decision to quit drag, stating on his official Instagram page, "For those asking, Tyra Sanchez has fulfilled her purpose in my life. I, James Ross, no longer want to be referred to as Tyra, Tyra Sanchez, her, she, girl, or queen."

Return
On September 14 2022, Ross announced his return to drag, once again under the name "King Tyra", exclusively on his OnlyFans. On January 26, 2023, Tyra announced her comeback tour, Club Tyra, visiting nineteen cities across the United States.

Personal life
Ross is a devout Christian and has one child.

Discography

Studio albums

Singles

Filmography

Television

Web series

References

External links

1988 births
Living people
African-American drag queens
American drag queens
LGBT African Americans
LGBT people from Florida
People from Gainesville, Florida
Tyra Sanchez